The Bangladesh Labour Federation (BLF) is a national trade union federation in Bangladesh. It is internationally affiliated with the International Trade Union Confederation.

History
Delwar Hossain Khan was President of the BLF until his death on November 3, 2020.

References

National trade union centres of Bangladesh
International Trade Union Confederation
Labour relations in Bangladesh